Ruediger Heining (* 1968 in Bielefeld, West Germany) is a German graduate economist and agricultural scientist. He is considered an expert on vocational education and development in South-West Europe and the Caucasus  and since 2017 has been managing director of the DEULA Baden-Wuerttemberg in Kirchheim unter Teck and vice-president of the  Bundesverbandes DEULA. (German Training Centre for Agricultural Engineering).

Life and work 
From 1993 Heining studied management, agricultural economics, agricultural politics, operational management and marketing at the University of Hohenheim and obtained his diploma in 1998. Thereafter he studied for a master's degree in international agricultural economics under  Franz Heidhues and Juergen Zeddies in Hohenheim. He also studied in the areas of E-learning systems, and an introduction into synchronous and asynchronous E-learning software at the University of Hagen, each time obtaining a graduation certificate.

From 1998 bis 2004 Heining worked as a scientific assistant, firstly at the East European Centre of Hohenheim University, then from 2001 as area head for Eastern Europe at the university's own project enterprise, IBH GmbH, where he was project manager for EU-PHARE, EU-TACIS, EU research projects and EU Twinning Projects, together with responsibility for the implementation of the Leonardo-da-Vinci project (Germany, Slovakia, Romania). Since 2010 he has also been active as an expert for the  World Bank (Washington) where he is involved in a project „Quality Management and Customer Orientation in Agricultural Administration“.

Following a number of foreign postings in connection with EU Twinning Projects, he was active at the UNDP in Georgia where worked as a diplomat and Project Manager in setting up a vocational training system. In March 2017 Ruediger Heining took over the management of  DEULA Baden-Wuerttemberg and in 2018 became the vice-president of the federal association DEULA e.V. He is also a member of the supervisory body of the German-Romanian Centre for Specialist Training and Continuing Education in Voiteg (Romania).

International engagement 
 Foreign postings in connection with the Austrian-German Twinning Project „Strengthening the Political Decision-Making Capacity of the Ministry of Agriculture and Rural Development in Romania“, and a commission from the German Federal Ministry of Food, Agriculture and Consumer Protection in cooperation with Agrarmarkt Austria 2006–2009.
 Foreign posting for functional checks of public administration in Romania (contract with the World Bank); project leader for the identification and registration of animals in Romania on behalf of the German Federal Ministry of Food, Agriculture and Consumer Protection.
 Foreign posting in connection with the German Twinning Project „Strengthening of Initial Vocational Training in the Area of Agriculture in the Republic of Azerbeijan“ (Name and Address of employer: German Federal Ministry of Food, Agriculture and Consumer Protection.
 Foreign posting for functional checks of public administration of agricultural administration in Cyprus (contract with the World Bank). Implementation of a strategic planning system in the Romanian government with particular emphasis on the Ministry of Agriculture and Rural Development (contract with the World Bank).
 Foreign posting as project manager. Main activity and responsibility: realisation of the project „ Modernisation of the Vocational Training and Education Systems in connection with Agriculture in Georgia“. Development programme of the United Nations in Georgia.

Publications (selection) 
 The setting up of partnership. Summary of the results of the Working Group 3 of the conference „Cooperatives as Entrpreneurs in Europe in the Year 2000. Conference Transcript of the Conference in Bologna from 30.11 to 1.12.1999. An Event of the EU Commission, DG XXIII.Page 5/4 -
 Heining R. S. Bara. 1999. Agriculture – An important economic sector for Romania: Analysis and possible Development. South-East Europe Review 2 (3): 95–110. Baden-Baden.
 Heining, R., Otiman, P. and F. Heidhues: Experiences from Institution Sequencing and Timing in Romania's Rural Financial Sector. IAAE-Conference 2000 in Berlin “Managing Tomorrow's Agriculture: Incentives, Institutions, Infrastructure and Innovations”. Proceedings of the Mini-Symposium “Institution Sequencing and Timing in Transition Economies”.
 Heining, R. and D. Böttcher. 2000. Agricultural Producer Associations and their Role in the Development of Romanian Rural Areas within EU-Integration. In: Lucrari Stiintifice, Management Agricol. I.Vol II. Editura Agroprint, Timisoara.
 Buchenrieder, G., Heining, R. und F. Heidhues: Development of Rural Finance Markets for Smallholder Farmers in Romania – Concept for Rural Finance Market Development in Transforming Economies. Stuttgart: Grauer Verlag, 2001.

References

External links 
 Homepage DEULA Baden-Württemberg Kirchheim
 The Teckbote (a daily newspaper) article on digitalisation of tractors and Ruediger Heining
 Management changes at the DEULA Baden-Wuerttemberg
 UNDP / ISET Studie: Knowledge Needs in Georgian Agriculture: The Case of Farming Households 
 East-West Forum and Eastern Europe Centre of the University of Hohenheim
 Ruediger Heining and Agriculture in Rumänien

Living people
German agronomists
1968 births
Scientists from Bielefeld